Backwoods Music Festival is a three- to four-day camping, music, and arts festival.

The festival began in 2008 as Backwoods Bash, a localized non-profit event featuring local Red Dirt, Folk, Indie, Jamband, and Americana music that took place in Keystone Lake Park in Prue, Oklahoma, over Memorial Day weekend. The event benefited kids in need of technology and other school supplies through the TC Lane Foundation. After seven years as a non-profit event with several different benefactors, the event took on investors to grow and expand into the EDM (Electronic Dance Music) and other contemporary genres, and the festival is now considered a "cross-over" festival. The festival rebranded itself in 2014, changing names to Backwoods Music Festival; changing locations to The Tatanka Ranch, a holiday ranch located near Route 66 in Stroud, Oklahoma; and changing dates to Labor Day weekend. The festival remained there in 2016. After a hiatus in 2017, the festival took place in early April 2018, this time changing sites to Mulberry Mountain in Ozark, Arkansas (the former home of the legendary Wakarusa Music Festival).

While the event is focused on music, art and experiences are also at the event's core.  Performing artists, art installations, and activities such as a Ferris Wheel, helicopter rides, water park activities, volleyball, billiards tournaments, free yoga classes, and hoop dance workshops serve as other attractions beyond the music.
 
The festival was called off in 2020.

See also
List of music festivals in the United States
List of country music festivals
List of electronic music festivals

References

Music festivals in Oklahoma
Electronic music festivals in the United States
Music festivals established in 2008
Folk festivals in the United States
2008 establishments in Oklahoma